Cruel, inhuman or degrading treatment (CIDT) is treatment of persons which is contrary to human rights or dignity, but is not classified as torture. It is forbidden by the Universal Declaration of Human Rights, Article 3 of the European Convention on Human Rights, the United Nations Convention against Torture and the International Covenant on Civil and Political Rights. Although the distinction between torture and CIDT is maintained from a legal point of view, medical and psychological studies have found that it does not exist from the psychological point of view, and people subjected to CIDT will experience the same consequences as survivors of torture. Based on this research, some practitioners have recommended abolishing the distinction.

Inhuman treatment 
The Equality and Human Rights Commission defines inhuman treatment as:

 serious physical assault
 psychological interrogation
 cruel detention conditions or restraints
 physical or psychological abuse in a healthcare setting
 threatening to torture someone

Degrading treatment 
The Equality and Human Rights Commission defines degrading treatment as undignified and humiliating treatment. Whether treatment is considered degrading is dependent on several factors, including the duration of the treatment; physical and mental effects on the victim; and the victim's age, race, sex, and vulnerabilities.

Medical or scientific experimentation without the free consent of the subject 
The International Covenant on Civil and Political Rights (ICCPR) in its Article 7 expressly prohibits the medical or scientific experimentation without free consent of its subject(s) and recognizes it as a particular form of torture or cruel, inhuman or degrading treatment. Moreover the Article 4.2 of the ICCPR expressly prohibits derogation from this prohibition in its Article 7 and thus is directly establishing it as Peremptory norm in this sense making the non-consensual medical or scientific experimentation potentially punishable under the provisions of national penal codes concerning the crimes of torture and cruel, inhuman or degrading treatment in all countries which are parties of the ICCPR and the Convention against Torture and Other Cruel, Inhuman or Degrading Treatment or Punishment.

Sources

References 

Human rights abuses
Torture